John "Jack" Oughton (September 18, 1876 – after 1940) was a skilled stonemason in Lincoln County, Idaho.  A number of his works are listed on the U.S. National Register of Historic Places.

Oughton was born in Ireland and immigrated to the United States in 1886. At the time of the 1910 United States Census, he was living in Twin Falls, Idaho with Mary Oughton, age 16, and was employed as a mason.  At the time of the 1920 United States Census he was living in Shoshone, Idaho with fellow stonemason and partner Alexander Reed.  At the time of the 1940 Census, he was still living in Shoshone and employed as a mason.  Sandy Reed was a partner, including in building the Jack Oughton House.

Works
American Legion Hall, built in 1928, at 107 W. A St., Shoshone, Idaho (Oughton,Jack), NRHP-listed
W. S. Kohl Barn, built in 1910, located northeast of Richfield Richfield, Idaho (Oughton,Jack), NRHP-listed
James H. Laine Barn, built in 1910, located south of Richfield, Idaho, (Oughton,Jack), NRHP-listed
W. H. Murphy House, built in 1928, at 607 S. Greenwood St., Shoshone, Idaho (Oughton,Jack), NRHP-listed 
Jack Oughton House, built in 1931, at 123 N. Beverly St., Shoshone, Idaho (Oughton,Jack), NRHP-listed

See also
Ignacio Berriochoa, a contemporary stonemason, also in Lincoln County
Bill Darrah, a contemporary stonemason, also in Lincoln County
H. T. Pugh, a contemporary stonemason in Jerome County

References

19th-century Irish people
20th-century Irish people
American stonemasons
People from Twin Falls, Idaho
Irish emigrants to the United States (before 1923)
1876 births
Year of death unknown
People from Shoshone, Idaho